Yandex Translate is a web service provided by Yandex, intended for the translation of text or web pages into another language.

The service uses a self-learning statistical machine translation, developed by Yandex. The system constructs the dictionary of single-word translations based on the analysis of millions of translated texts. In order to translate the text, the computer first compares it to a database of words. The computer then compares the text to the base language models, trying to determine the meaning of an expression in the context of the text.

In September 2017, Yandex.Translate switched to a hybrid approach incorporating both statistical machine translation and neural machine translation models.

The translation page first appeared in 2009, utilizing PROMT, and was also built into Yandex Browser itself, to assist in translation for websites.

Supported languages 
Immediately after the launch of the translator in beta mode in the spring of 2010, it was only available in three languages — English, Russian and Ukrainian, with a limit of 10,000 characters.

Yandex.Translate has some languages that are missing from Google Translate, such as Russian national minority languages.

As of January 2023, translation is available in 98 languages:

 Afrikaans
 Albanian
 Amharic 
 Arabic
 Armenian
 Azerbaijani
 Bashkir
 Basque
 Belarusian
 Bengali
 Bosnian
 Bulgarian
 Burmese 
 Catalan
 Cebuano
 Chinese
 Chuvash
 Croatian
 Czech
 Danish
 Dutch
 Elvish (Sindarin) 
 Emoji (Not a natural language)
 English
 Esperanto
 Estonian
 Finnish
 French
 Galician
 Georgian
 German
 Greek
 Gujarati
 Haitian Creole
 Hebrew
 Hill Mari 
 Hindi
 Hungarian
 Icelandic
 Indonesian
 Irish
 Italian
 Japanese
 Javanese
 Kannada
 Kazakh (Cyrillic and Latin)
 Khmer
 Korean
 Kyrgyz 
 Lao 
 Latin
 Latvian
 Lithuanian
 Luxembourgish
 Macedonian
 Malagasy
 Malay
 Malayalam 
 Maltese
 Māori
 Marathi
 Meadow Mari 
 Mongolian 
 Nepali
 Norwegian
 Papiamento 
 Persian
 Polish
 Portuguese (European and Brazilian)
 Punjabi
 Romanian
 Russian
 Scottish Gaelic
 Serbian (Cyrillic and Latin)
 Sinhala
 Slovak
 Slovenian
 Spanish
 Sundanese
 Swahili
 Swedish
 Tagalog
 Tajik 
 Tamil 
 Tatar
 Telugu 
 Thai
 Turkish
 Udmurt 
 Ukrainian
 Urdu
 Uzbek (Latin and Cyrillic)
 Vietnamese
 Welsh
 Xhosa 
 Yakut  
 Yiddish
 Zulu

The translation direction is determined automatically. It is possible to translate words, sentences, or web pages if needed. There is also the option to view both the translation and the original at the same time in a two-window view. In addition to machine translation, there is also an accessible and complete English-Russian and Russian-English dictionary. There is an app for devices based on the iOS software, Windows Phone and Android. You can listen to the pronunciation of the translation and the original text using a text to speech converter built in.

Translations of sentences and words can be stored to a "Favorites" section located below the input field.

Limitations 
Yandex.Translate, like other automatic translation tools, has its limitations. When the online service was first introduced, the head of Yandex.Translate, Alexei Baitin, stated that although machine translation cannot be compared to a literary text, the translations produced by the system can provide a convenient option for understanding the general meaning of the text in a foreign language.

Translation methodology 
According to Arkady Volozh, founder and CEO of Yandex, the mechanism of Translate is as follows:

In addition to the free version for users, there is a commercial API online translator (free up to 10 million characters, then paid), designed primarily for the localization of sites of Internet shops and travel companies.

Features 
 the mobile app for iOS is available for the transliteration of the Arabic, Armenian, Chinese (Pinyin), Georgian, Greek, Hebrew, Japanese, Korean and Persian languages;
 voice input;
 photo text translation feature (uses its own OCR (optical character recognition) technology) – in apps for mobile phones;
 the "Suggest translation" button (user patches to help improve the quality of machine translations);
 the "Favorites" section, where you can add translations of individual words and sentences;
 virtual keyboard.

See also 

 Apertium
 Comparison of machine translation applications
 Google Translate
 Microsoft Translator
 PROMT
 StarDict
 SYSTRAN
 WikiBhasha

References

External links 
 Yandex.Translate (in English)

Machine translation software
Natural language processing software
Products introduced in 2011
Translation websites
Translate